Radical 167 or radical gold meaning "gold" or "metal" is one of the 9 Kangxi radicals (214 radicals in total) composed of 8 strokes. It also represents the Chinese family name, Jin, which is No. 29[1] of the Hundred Family Surnames.

In the Kangxi Dictionary, there are 806 characters (out of 49,030) to be found under this radical.

In the Chinese Wuxing ("Five Phases"), 金 represents the element Metal.

Evolution

Derived characters

Literature

External links

Unihan Database - U+91D1

167
176